Blewcoat School is a building in Caxton Street, London, that was built in 1709 as a school for the poor (a Bluecoat school). It was used as a school until 1926. In 1954, it was purchased by the National Trust who used it as a gift shop and information centre. In 2013 the building was refurbished as The Blewcoat, a store for fashion designer Ian Stuart.

School

The school was founded in Duck Lane in about 1688 by voluntary subscription as a charity school for the education of poor boys to teach them reading, writing, religion, and trades. It moved to purpose-built premises in Caxton Street. From 1714 to about 1876, it also admitted girls. In 1899, it was agreed that the school should move to a site that had been owned by the Christ Church National Schools Trust, and the Caxton Street site was then used for an elementary school. The school closed in 1926.

Later uses
During World War II, the building was used by the American services as a store. Afterwards, the Girl Guides used it as a youth club. When the National Trust bought it in 1954, it was used as their membership and head office. Later, it was converted into a gift shop. June 2014 saw the opening of British designer Ian Stuart's boutique in the building, selling bridal gowns, special occasion wear and evening gown collections.

References

Westminister Blewcoat School
National Trust properties in London
Defunct schools in the City of Westminster
Educational institutions established in the 1680s
Educational institutions disestablished in 1926
School buildings completed in 1709
Tourist attractions in the City of Westminster
Boys' schools in London
1709 establishments in England
1926 disestablishments in England
Grade I listed buildings in the City of Westminster